Hirkan (known as Avrora until 1999) is a village and municipality in the Lankaran Rayon of Azerbaijan. It has a population of 1,781.

References

Populated places in Lankaran District